Bishop of Wangaratta may refer to:

 Anglican Bishop of Wangaratta
 Bishop of the Roman Catholic Diocese of Sandhurst